The Second McGowan Ministry is the 37th ministry of the Government of Western Australia. Led by the Premier Mark McGowan and Deputy Premier Roger Cook, it succeeded the First McGowan Ministry following the 2021 election and was sworn in on 19 March 2021.

References

Australian Labor Party ministries in Western Australia
Lists of current office-holders in Australia
Western Australian ministries
2021 establishments in Australia
Ministries of Elizabeth II
Ministries of Charles III